Encounters in the Ventura Quadrant is a 1980 role-playing game supplement for Traveller published by Group One.

Contents
Encounters in the Ventura Quadrant presents more starships and their crews for Traveller campaigns.

Publication history
Encounters in the Ventura Quadrant was published in 1980 by Group One as a 16-page book.

Reception
William A. Barton reviewed Encounters in the Ventura Quadrant in The Space Gamer No. 34. Barton commented that "Group One shows definite promise as an up-and-coming competitor in the field of Traveller play aids. Encounters in the Ventura Quadrant can do nothing but add to your enjoyment in running starship encounters."

References

Role-playing game supplements introduced in 1980
Traveller (role-playing game) supplements